Izzi is a North Eastern Igbo sub-group, in South Eastern, Nigeria. It is also the name of the territory in which they live, the Local Government Area of Izzi. They speak the Izzi dialect.
Izzi is spoken majorly in Ebonyi State and some parts of Benue State.

Notes

Igbo clans
Igbo subgroups
Local Government Areas in Ebonyi State
Local Government Areas in Igboland
Populated places in Ebonyi State